Pink is a pale red color.

Pink, Pinks, or Pink's may also refer to:

Brands and companies
 Pink's Hot Dogs, a restaurant
 Thomas Pink, a chain of clothing stores
 Pink (Victoria's Secret), product line by Victoria's Secret
 PINK, a brand of pink-colored fiberglass insulation made by Owens Corning

Film
 Pink (2011 film), a 2011 Korean film
 Pink (2016 film), a 2016 Indian film
 Pink, a film at the 2007 Toronto International Film Festival
 Pink film, a term for Japanese films that include nudity or deal with sexual content
 A character in Pink Floyd – The Wall
 Lead character nickname in 1993 film Dazed and Confused

Music
 Pink (singer) (born 1979), stage name of musician Alecia Moore (also stylized "P!nk")
 Apink, Korean girl band
 Pink, the protagonist of Pink Floyd album The Wall

Albums
 Pink (Boris album), 2005
 Pink (Four Tet album), 2012
 Pink (Mindless Self Indulgence album), 2015
Pink, a 2017 album by Chai

Songs
 "Pink" (song), by Aerosmith

Places
 Pink, Mazandaran Province, Iran
 Pink, Kentucky, unincorporated community
 Pink, Mississippi, ghost town
 Pink, Oklahoma, town
 Pink, West Virginia, unincorporated community
 Pink Bay, a bay in South Australia
 Pink Creek, a stream in Georgia

Technology
 Microsoft Kin, a mobile phone line (originally codenamed Project Pink)
 Taligent, an Apple/IBM partner corporation with software codenamed Pink

Television
 Pinks (TV series) , a racing show
 Pink TV (France), a gay-oriented channel
 Pink TV (US), a pornography channel
 RTV Pink, a Serbian network
 "Colours – Pink", an episode of Teletubbies

Other uses
 Pink (LGBT magazine), for lesbian, gay, bisexual, and transgender people
 Pink (manga), a 1982 one-shot manga by Akira Toriyama
 Pink (novel), by Gus Van Sant
 Pink (ship), a type of watercraft
 Pink (surname), and people with the name
 "The Pink" or "The Carnation", a German fairy tale collected by the Brothers Grimm
 PINK!, the youth wing of the Dutch political party Party for the Animals
 Pink/pinks, a number of flowers in the genus Dianthus
 Pink, for plants, most commonly applied to Dianthus plumarius
 Mountbatten pink, a camouflage colour applied to British ships during World War Two
 Acrodynia, also known as "Pink's Disease"
 Pink, a fictional character from the web series Dick Figures
 Pinko, a communist sympathizer
 Pinks, the name for red coats traditionally worn  in fox hunting
 Pinks and greens, a US Army's officer winter service uniform from World War II
 U-47700, a synthetic opioid drug commonly called "pink"
 Airpink, airline call sign: AIR PINK
 Crazy Pink, Akita Northern Happinets boosters
 Post and pair, a card game sometimes known as "pink"

See also

 Little Pink,  young jingoistic Chinese nationalists on the internet
 "Pynk", a song by Janelle Monáe
 PINQ (C# API), see Implementations of differentially private analyses
 
 
 The Pink Panther (disambiguation)
 Pink slip (disambiguation)
 Pinking (disambiguation)
 Pinky (disambiguation)
 Pinque (disambiguation)